Chigirtma is an egg dish from Azerbaijan. The word chigirtma (çığırtma) in the name of the dish means that it includes eggs. Chigirtma literally means in Azerbaijani “screaming”. It is believed that the dish is called so because of the sounds the meat (or vegetable) makes while cooking in hot oil. Chigirtma is made from chicken, eggplants, green beans, spinach and mutton.

Types

Chicken 
The main ingredients of chicken chigirtma are chicken, onions, lemon water, eggs, vegetable oil or melted butter and spices.

Preparation 
The chicken is boiled, then placed in the pan and chopped fried onions, lemon juice, spices are added on it. A little broth is poured before simmering 20 minutes. Eggs are added to the chicken and cooked until the dish is done. Chicken-chigirtma can be served with plain plov which is known as chigirtma-plov.

Green bean 
Green beans, onions, eggs, dill, vegetable oil and spices are used in preparation of Green bean chigirtma. Beans are cut into small pieces and boiled. Eggs, chopped dill and spices are mixed in a bowl and then added to the fried onions with cooked beans. The dish is served with “” (yogurt with crushed garlic).

Eggplant 
The main ingredients of badimjan (eggplant) chighirtma are eggplants, onions, melted butter, eggs, parsley and spices. Sliced eggplants are salted and pressed to remove its bitter juice. Eggplants are added to fried onions and is cooked, then eggs are added. Melted butter and greens are added before serving.

Forcemeat 
Forcemeat chigirtma is made with forcemeat from mutton, onions, melted butter, saffron and eggs. Chopped dill is added before serving.

Spinach 
Spinach, sorrel, onions, eggs and melted butter are the main ingredients of ispanag (spinach) chigirtma. Soured milk and chopped parsley are served with this dish.

Ganja 
This version of chigirtma is specific to Ganja city of Azerbaijan. The dish is made with mutton, onions, melted butter, tomatoes, greens (coriander and dill), and spices. Meat is cooked in its broth in a deep pan. Separately fried onions and eggs are added when the meat is done. The mixture is simmered until eggs are done. Tomatoes and greens are added before serving. Ganja chigirtma is served with soured milk.

See also 

 Azerbaijani cuisine

References

Turkish cuisine
Azerbaijani cuisine
Egg dishes
Azerbaijani words and phrases